Soo Line 2713 is an H-21 class 4-6-2 steam locomotive that was built for the Wisconsin Central Railway in May 1911. The WC had fallen under the control of the Minneapolis, St. Paul and Sault Ste. Marie Railway (“Soo Line”) in 1909, and the locomotive fleets of both railroads were operated in a single pool.

The 2713 was used to power the Soo Line and Wisconsin Central passenger trains in Wisconsin, Minnesota and North Dakota.  It was retired in 1955, and since 1957 has been on display in Veterans Memorial Park in Stevens Point, Wisconsin, United States.  With it is Soo Line Caboose 99052, built in 1908 for the Wisconsin Central Railway, their No. 158.

References

2713
ALCO locomotives
4-6-2 locomotives
Individual locomotives of the United States
Stevens Point, Wisconsin
Preserved steam locomotives of Wisconsin
Railway locomotives introduced in 1911
Standard gauge locomotives of the United States